Hampton Township School District is a midsize, urban/suburban public school district operating in Allegheny County, Pennsylvania. The district serves only the residents of Hampton Township, Western Pennsylvania, USA. According to 2000 federal census data, Hampton Township School District served a resident population of 17,526 people. Per the US Census Bureau in 2010, the population rose to 18,367 people. The district graduated its first class in 1943.

In 2009, Hampton Township School District residents’ per capita income was $29,071, while the median family income was $67,367. In the Commonwealth, the median family income was $49,501  and the United States median family income was $49,445, in 2010.  By 2013, the median household income in the United States rose to $52,100.

Hampton's mascot is the talbot, which is an extinct hunting dog.  It is also the only high school in the United States with the Talbot as their mascot.

The district operates five public schools: Hampton High School, Hampton Middle School  and three elementary schools. Hampton High School students may choose to attend A. W. Beattie Career Center for training.

Extracurriculars
The Hampton Township School District offers a wide variety of clubs, activities and an extensivesports program.

Sports
The district funds:

Varsity

Boys
Baseball - AAAAA
Basketball- AAAAA
Cross Country - AAA
Football - AAAA
Golf - AAA
Indoor Track and Field - AAAA
Lacrosse - AAAA
Soccer - AAA
Swimming and Diving - AAA
Tennis - AAA
Track and Field - AAA
Wrestling	- AAA

Girls
Basketball - AAAAA
Cross Country - AAA
Gymnastics - AAAA
Indoor Track and Field - AAAA
Lacrosse - AAAA
Soccer (Fall) - AAA
Softball - AAAAA
Swimming and Diving - AAA
Girls' Tennis - AAA
Track and Field - AAA
Volleyball - AAA

Middle School Sports:

Boys
Basketball
Cross Country
Football
Track and Field
Wrestling	

Girls
Basketball
Cross Country
Softball 
Track and Field
Volleyball

According to PIAA directory July 2013

References

External links
 

1943 establishments in Pennsylvania
School districts in Allegheny County, Pennsylvania
Education in Pittsburgh area